Kanat Kalizhanovich Abutalipov (born March 22, 1983 in Barshino) is a Kazakhstani boxer who competed at the 2008 Olympics at bantamweight but lost his only fight to eventual silver medallist Yankiel León (3:10) from Cuba.

At the World Championships 2009 he won two bouts and made it to the quarterfinals.

At the 2012 Summer Olympics, he again lost to the eventual bantamweight silver medalist, John Joe Nevin, this time in the last 16.

References

External links

Living people
Bantamweight boxers
Boxers at the 2008 Summer Olympics
Boxers at the 2012 Summer Olympics
Olympic boxers of Kazakhstan
1983 births
Boxers at the 2006 Asian Games
Kazakhstani male boxers
Asian Games competitors for Kazakhstan